Tami or TAMI may refer to:

People and fictional characters
 Tami (given name), a list of people and fictional characters with either the given name or nickname
 Mark Tami (born 1962), British politician and Member of Parliament
 Pierluigi Tami (born 1961), Swiss retired footballer
 Tami (singer) (born 1964), or TAMI, American singer

Other uses
 Tami (political party), a political party in Israel in the 1980s
 Tami language, a language of Papua New Guinea
 Tami Islands, Papua New Guinea
 Texas Archive of the Moving Image (TAMI)

See also
 T.A.M.I. Show, a 1964 popular music concert film
 Tamme (disambiguation)
 Tammi (disambiguation)
 Tammy (disambiguation)